The Samsung Galaxy A51 is an Android smartphone manufactured by Samsung Electronics as part of its Galaxy A series. It was announced and released in December 2019. The phone has a Super AMOLED FHD+ 6.5 in display, a 48 MP wide, 12 MP ultrawide, 5 MP depth, and 5 MP macro camera, a 4000 mAh battery, and an optical in-screen fingerprint sensor.

Specifications

Hardware
The Galaxy A51 has a 6.5 in Super AMOLED Infinity O display with an FHD+ 1080 × 2400 pixel resolution, a 20:9 aspect ratio, and a pixel density of ~405 ppi. The front glass is constructed of Corning Gorilla Glass 3. The phone itself measures  ×  ×  and weighs . The phone is powered by an Exynos 9611 (10 nm) octa-core (4 × 2.3 GHz Cortex-A73 & 4 × 1.7 GHz Cortex-A53) chip and a Mali-G72 MP3 GPU. At release, it came with either 4 GB or 6 GB RAM and either 64 GB or 128GB internal storage, which can be expanded with a microSD card up to 512 GB. Newer variants of the phone can come with up to 8 GB RAM. It comes with a non-removable 4000 mAh lithium polymer battery. It also has an in-display optical fingerprint sensor.

Cameras
The Samsung Galaxy A51 has a four camera setup arranged in an "L" shape located in the corner with a rectangular protrusion similar to that of the iPhone 11 and the Pixel 4. The array consists of a 48 MP wide angle camera, a 12 MP ultrawide camera, a 5 MP macro camera, and a 5 MP depth sensor. It also has a single 32 MP front facing camera, which sits in a small punch hole on the front of the screen. Both the front and rear facing cameras can record video up to 4K in 30 fps, as well as 1080p in 30 and 120 fps. The rear cameras also have Super Steady.

Software
The Galaxy A51 comes with Android 10 and One UI 2 (Currently One UI 5.0) (Currently Android 13). The phone has Samsung Knox for added system security. 

On 2 December 2020, it was revealed that the Galaxy A51, along with many other Samsung Galaxy devices, would be eligible to receive the Android 11 upgrade with One UI 3.1. 

In a press release on August 18, 2020, Samsung stated that the A51, along with the Samsung Galaxy A71 and Samsung Galaxy A90 5G, would receive three generations of Android software support. Because of this, it is likely that the A51 will get two more major Android software upgrades after receiving Android 11.

Design
The Galaxy A51 comes in Prism Crush Black, Prism Crush White, and Prism Crush Blue, while the 5G variant comes in Prism Cube Black, Prism Cube White, Prism Cube Pink.

History
The Samsung Galaxy A51 was announced and released in December 2019 along with the Galaxy A71. Samsung later announced a 5G variant in April 2020 featuring a larger 4500mAh battery and an Exynos 9811 SoC. A 5G ultra-wideband version with mmWave support is exclusive to Verizon powered by the Qualcomm Snapdragon 765G.

See also
Samsung Galaxy A50
Samsung Galaxy A series
One UI

References

Samsung Galaxy
Mobile phones introduced in 2019
Android (operating system) devices
Samsung smartphones
Mobile phones with multiple rear cameras
Mobile phones with 4K video recording